Melita Isidora Abraham Schüssler (born 7 July 1997) is a Chilean rower. Together with quadruplet sister Antonia, they have won several medals at age-group championships, including gold in the coxless pair at the 2017 World U23 Championships.

She is also a 2015 Pan American Games silver medallist in the coxless pair and has competed in the lightweight double sculls event at the 2016 Summer Olympics.

References

External links
 
 
 

1997 births
Living people
Chilean female rowers
Olympic rowers of Chile
Rowers at the 2016 Summer Olympics
Rowers at the 2014 Summer Youth Olympics
Pan American Games medalists in rowing
Pan American Games silver medalists for Chile
Rowers at the 2015 Pan American Games
Medalists at the 2015 Pan American Games
21st-century Chilean women